Sankt Veit in der Südsteiermark is a municipality since 2015 in the Leibnitz District of Styria, Austria. The population was 4,069 residents (as of 1 January 2016).

The municipality, Sankt Veit in der Südsteiermark, was created as part of the Styria municipal structural reform,
at the end of 2014, by merging the former towns Sankt Veit am Vogau and Sankt Nikolai ob Draßling, both in the political district Leibnitz, plus the town Weinburg am Saßbach in the political Südoststeiermark District.

The borders of the Südoststeiermark District and Leibnitz District were shifted, so that the new municipality would lie completely within Leibnitz District.

The former municipality Weinburg am Saßbach was until the end of 2012 in Radkersburg District and had the Kfz-code "RA". From the middle of 2013 until the end of 2014, the code had abbreviation "SO"; in 2015 it was set as "LB".

Geography

Municipality arrangement 
The municipality territory includes the following 11 Katastralgemeinden and 16 sections (populations as of 1 January 2015):
Katastralgemeinden

 Hütt
 Labuttendorf
 Lind
 Lipsch
 Neutersdorf
 Perbersdorf bei St. Veit
 Pichla
 St. Nikolai ob Draßling
 St. Veit am Vogau
 Siebing  
 Weinburg

Ortschaften

 Hütt (185)
 Labuttendorf (173)
 Leitersdorf (135)
 Lind bei St. Veit am Vogau (220)
 Lipsch (182)
 Marchtring (19)
 Neutersdorf (92)
 Perbersdorf bei Sankt Veit (146)
 Pichla bei Mureck (156)
 Priebing (101)
 Rabenhof (149)
 Sankt Nikolai ob Draßling (771)
 Sankt Veit am Vogau (598)
 Siebing (272)
 Wagendorf (515)
 Weinburg am Saßbach (363)

Neighboring municipalities 
The municipality is bordered by seven neighboring towns, four were in Südoststeiermark District (SO).

Demographics

Politics

Mayor 
Manfred Tatzl (ÖVP) was elected mayor of the newly formed municipality on 20 April 2015, in the inaugural meeting of the Municipal Council. Tatzl was already, at the end of 2014, the mayor of the former municipality of St. Veit am Vogau and led from January 1, 2015, the transactions of the merged municipality as government commissioner.

Josef Pratter, the nearly 25-year mayor of St. Nikolai ob Draßling, was and the former mayor of the municipality of Weinburg am Saßbach, Susanne Lucchesi-Palli, came to the election.

With the results from April 30, 2015, Manfred Tatzl traveled by his council mandate, because he wants to conduct the business of the merged municipality as a "People's Mayor". [7]

The town council also includes the first deputy mayor Gerhard Rohrer, the second Deputy Mayor Harald Schögler, the municipality treasurer Georg Pock and board member Rudolf Reinprecht.

Municipality council 
The town council has 21 members. After the 2015 election, the council had the following results:
 12 Mandate ÖVP
 6 Mandate SPÖ
 3 Mandate FPÖ

The prior elections brought the following results:

Coat of arms 

All three predecessors had a town crest. Because of the merger, the crests lost their official validity on January 1, 2015. The authorization of the municipal coat of arms for the joined community took effect on 25 October 2016.
Blazon (crest description):
 "Above the silvery shield-foot, over a black, silver-floated wave-beam green three grapes growing from common origin upward and two flat wine leaves, in blue a golden, richly arranged and of window and door fifteenfold black perforated with volute gable and two with Knauf and cross at golden towers; between these, a silver lion's head".

References

External links 

 Town of St. Veit in der Sudsteiermark: Official Homepage 

Cities and towns in Leibnitz District